Opal Pool is a hot spring in the Midway Geyser Basin of Yellowstone National Park, Wyoming. Though usually active as a hot spring, Opal Pool is considered a fountain-type geyser.

The first recorded eruption of Opal Pool was in 1947, recurring in 1949, 1952 and 1953, then ceasing. Eruptions resumed in 1979, happening at least once in most following years. Eruptions occur suddenly following visible convection in the pool, but are unpredictable. An eruption consists of one, huge, burst that throws water 20–80 feet high, making Opal Pool the largest active geyser at Midway Geyser Basin. Much smaller splashes seconds apart stretch the total duration to about 1 minute. In 2005 Opal completely drained, but refilled as a vivid green pool in 2008.

See also
List of Yellowstone geothermal features
Yellowstone National Park
Geothermal areas of Yellowstone

References

Geysers of Wyoming
Geothermal features of Teton County, Wyoming
Geothermal features of Yellowstone National Park
Geysers of Teton County, Wyoming